Montserrat Figueras i García (15 March 1942 – 23 November 2011) was a Spanish soprano who specialized in early music.

Figueras was born 15 March 1942 in Barcelona, Spain. After initially training as an actress she began studying early singing techniques in 1966, together with her sister Pilar Figueras, and developed an approach and technique for singing early music which combined historical fidelity with vitality.

In 1974 she and Jordi Savall, her husband since 1968, Lorenzo Alpert and Hopkinson Smith formed Hespèrion XX (Later: Hespèrion XXI), an early  music ensemble. Figueras and her husband also founded the groups La Capella Reial de Catalunya and Le Concert des Nations.

Figueras performed and recorded regularly as a solo artist and she and her husband also performed with their children: daughter Arianna and son Ferran.

She died on 23 November 2011 in Cerdanyola del Vallès, surrounded by her family, after a long battle with cancer. The funeral was held at the Monastery of Pedralbes in Barcelona.

Notes

External links
 In Memoriam Montserrat Figueras (at Alia Vox website)

1942 births
2011 deaths
Deaths from cancer in Spain
Musicians from Barcelona
Musicians from Catalonia
Performers of medieval music
Spanish sopranos
Spanish performers of early music
Women performers of early music
20th-century Spanish musicians
20th-century Spanish women singers
20th-century Spanish singers